Entellus was a Trojan or Sicilian hero from whom the town of Entella in Sicily was believed to have received its name. He was a friend of the Trojan king Acestes. A boxing match between Entellus and an arrogant younger boxer, Dares, is described in the fifth book of Virgil's Aeneid.

Entellus is the namesake of the Gray langur Presbytis entellus.

See also
List of Greek mythological figures

Note

References

 Maurus Servius Honoratus, In Vergilii carmina comentarii. Servii Grammatici qui feruntur in Vergilii carmina commentarii; recensuerunt Georgius Thilo et Hermannus Hagen. Georgius Thilo. Leipzig. B. G. Teubner. 1881. Online version at the Perseus Digital Library.
 Publius Vergilius Maro, Aeneid. Theodore C. Williams. trans. Boston. Houghton Mifflin Co. 1910. Online version at the Perseus Digital Library.
 Publius Vergilius Maro, Bucolics, Aeneid, and Georgics. J. B. Greenough. Boston. Ginn & Co. 1900. Latin text available at the Perseus Digital Library.
 http://department.monm.edu/history/faculty_forum/Theissen_a_boxing_match.htm

Characters in the Aeneid
Sicilian characters in Greek mythology

it:Entello